The LSE SU Alternative Investments Conference (also known as the LSE AIC) is an international conference on hedge funds, private equity and venture capital held annually in London, United Kingdom by the LSE Alternative Investments Society (AIC), a Student’s Union society at the London School of Economics and Political Science (LSE).

History
The Alternative Investments Society was founded in 2006 by a group of undergraduate students at the LSE, and continues to be run by students from the university. The first Alternative Investments Conference was a one-day event hosted on the LSE campus in 2007, and was attended by 200 students who heard from several notable investors. The AIC has evolved considerably over its twelve-year history, having changed venues and ultimately becoming the world’s largest student conference on hedge funds, private equity and venture capital.

Overview

Format 
The Conference takes place over two days at the five-star London Marriott Hotel Grosvenor Square, bringing together over 40 senior level industry leaders (see notable past speakers) and 320 student delegates from many of the world’s leading educational institutions. Delegates come from a range of backgrounds, including both undergraduates and postgraduates studying finance, law, engineering, history as well as many other disciplines. Admission to the Conference is competitive, with only 4.3% of applicants to AIC 2017 being selected to attend. The Conference is international in character, with applicants coming from over 200 universities located across more than 120 countries world wide.

The format of the Conference sees delegates attend keynote speeches, panel discussions and workshop sessions designed to allow for them to learn from and interact with experienced professionals from within the investment community. Networking events are also held during the Conference by the AIC’s partner firms, as well as a dinner for all attending delegates hosted during the evening of the first day of the event. Sponsor firms of the AIC include Point72 Asset Management, Dartmouth Partners, Canada Pension Plan Investment Board, Terra Firma Capital Partners, GAM, Amicus, Bain & Company, Bain Capital, 3i, Patron Capital, Lansdowne Partners, Stable Asset Management, and Dechert.

In the Media 
The Conference is well regarded on campus, as well as outside of the LSE, having been cited in the media a number of times and described by the Financial Times as 'a chance for the best brains in asset management to meet'. Several keynote sessions from past conferences are also available to watch online.

Notable past speakers
Several notable past speakers at the AIC include:
David Rubenstein (Co-Founder & Co-CEO, The Carlyle Group) 
Daniel A. D'Aniello (Co-Founder & Chairman, The Carlyle Group) 
David Bonderman (Co-Founder, TPG Capital) 
Guy Hands (Founder & Chairman, Terra Firma Capital Partners) 
Luke Ellis (CEO, Man Group)
Marc Rowan, (Co-Founder, Apollo Global Management) 
Glenn Hutchins (Co-Founder, Silver Lake Partners) 
Jim Breyer (Founder & CEO, Breyer Capital) 
Arif Naqvi (Founder & CEO, The Abraaj Group) 
Paul Singer (Founder & CEO, Elliott Management Corporation) 
Marc Lasry (Co-Founder & CEO, Avenue Capital Group) 
Sir Michael Hintze (Founder & CEO, CQS) 
Emmanuel Roman (CEO, PIMCO) 
James Chanos (Founder & President, Kynikos Associates) 
Dr Josef Ackermann (Former CEO, Deutsche Bank) 
Sir Howard Davies (Former Director of the LSE & former Chairman of the Financial Services Authority) 
Michelle Scrimgeour (EMEA CEO, Columbia Threadneedle) 
Sir Andrew Large (Former Deputy Governor, Bank of England) 
Gillian Tett (U.S. Managing Editor, Financial Times) 
Anthony Scaramucci (Founder, SkyBridge Capital)

AIC 2020 
The 2020 Alternative Investments Conference (AIC 2020) will be held at the London Marriott Hotel Grosvenor Square, on February 3 and 4 2020. The event will mark the fourteenth annual edition of the Conference and will feature 320 delegates and 40 speakers across 2 days.

References

External links
Official website
Official website of London School of Economics and Political Science

Business conferences
International conferences in the United Kingdom
Recurring events established in 2007
Alternative Investment Conference